The 2007 Chicago Marathon was the 30th running of the annual marathon race in Chicago, United States and was held on October 7. The elite men's race was won by Kenya's Patrick Ivuti in a time of 2:11:11 hours and the women's race was won by Ethiopia's Berhane Adere in 2:33:49.

Results

Men

Women

Death of Chad Schieber
A participant in the 2007 Chicago Marathon, Chad Schieber of Michigan, died suddenly while attempting to finish the race. His death was brought on by complications involving his previous diagnosis of mitral valve prolapse.

References

Results. Association of Road Racing Statisticians. Retrieved 2020-04-06.

External links 
 Official website

Chicago Marathon
Chicago
2000s in Chicago
2007 in Illinois
Chicago Marathon
Chicago Marathon